Harry Edwin Hamilton (born November 29, 1962) is a former American football safety. Hamilton was the first Black African-American to graduate from John S. Fine High School, Nanticoke, Pennsylvania.

Early life
His father Stan Hamilton was a civil rights activist in New York in the 1960s and a writer of Sesame Street. In 1972, the family moved to a horse farm owned by Stan Hamilton and his father-in-law, after a flood damaged their house in Wilkes-Barre. They were the only black people in the area and Hamilton suffered abuse at school, being called racial slurs and seeing a burning cross on a bonfire during a football pep rally. He set several track records at school and proved to be an adept Western-style horse rider and football player. After graduating, the family moved back to Wilkes-Barre.

Football career
Having graduated with honors, he was recruited by a number of colleges for his excellence in academics and athletics before selecting Penn State. During his collegiate career, he was an Academic All-American safety at Penn State University following the 1982 National Championship season and 1983 seasons. After which, he played eight seasons as a safety in the National Football League with the New York Jets and Tampa Bay Buccaneers before retiring in 1993.

Post-football career
During his professional football career, Hamilton attended law school and immediately put his Juris Doctor degree to work for legal services in Tampa, Florida before embarking on a career in the United States Army Judge Advocate General's Corps.

In March 2018, Hamilton was charged with a number of offenses including burglary, criminal trespassing, a misdemeanor count of simple assault and two summary offenses of harassment after he confronted his son about drug abuse. He was also accused of forcing his way into his ex-wife's home and assaulting his son. Hamilton was arraigned and released on $25,000 unsecured bail.

References

1962 births
Living people
Sportspeople from the Bronx
Players of American football from New York City
American football safeties
New York Jets players
Tampa Bay Buccaneers players
Penn State Nittany Lions football players
Ed Block Courage Award recipients